The Inbetween is the second studio album by American Christian rock band Scarlet White The album was self–released on October 14, 2014.

Production
The album was recorded at GCR Audio in Buffalo, New York, which is owned by Robby Takac of the Goo Goo Dolls. Justin Rose produced the album with the band.

Track listing

Personnel
Scarlet White
 Spencer Minor – lead vocals
 Dan Hall – guitar
 Bradley Preston — bass
 Brick Hendricks – drums, percussion

Additional personnel
 Justin Rose – engineer
 Mike Langford – mixing
 Peter Letros – mastering
 Richie English – orchestration, piano, keyboards, backing vocals
 Claire Fisher – violin
 Gretchen Fisher – violin
 Kiersten Fisher – viola
 Katie Weismann – cello
 Bradley Preston – bass
 Joe Donahue – backing vocals
 Hannah Matthews – backing vocals

References

2014 albums
Scarlet White albums
Concept albums
Self-released albums